Béla Kovács (May 1, 1937 – November 7, 2021) was a Hungarian clarinetist.

Education
Kovács was born in Tatabánya, Hungary. He graduated from the Franz Liszt Academy of Music in Budapest, Hungary.

Performance career
Kovács was principal clarinetist with the Hungarian State Opera Orchestra and the Budapest Philharmonic Orchestra since 1956, until he retired in 1981.

Teaching career
Kovács was a Professor of Clarinet at the Franz Liszt Academy of Music in Budapest and at the University of Music  and Dramatic Arts in Graz, Austria. He composed a set of concert etudes for clarinet called "Hommages" that are written in the style of a number of different composers and are studied and performed widely today.

Compositions 
Hommages for Clarinet Solo

 Hommage a J.S. Bach 
 Hommage a N. Paganini
 Hommage a C.M. von Weber 
 Hommage a C. Debussy 
 Hommage a M. de Falla
 Hommage a R. Strauss
 Hommage a B. Bartók
 Hommage a Z. Kodály
 Hommage a A. Khachaturian 
Studies and Exercises
 I Learn to Play the Clarinet 1
 I Learn to Play the Clarinet 2
 Everyday Scale Exercises

 Béla Kovács, Hommage á C.M. von Weber, Arsenije Marić, clarinete   https://www.youtube.com/watch?v=o2UMLxMpSjg==References==
  Hommage à Zoltan Kodály for Solo Clarinet - Arsenije Marić https://www.youtube.com/watch?v=0ZlZLeBi93Y

External links
 Personal website

1937 births
2021 deaths
Hungarian classical clarinetists
People from Tatabánya
21st-century clarinetists